Sweet Home Sextuplets is an American reality series on TLC starring Eric and Courtney Waldrop, parents of a 3-3 set of sextuplets in Alabama. The series debuted on September 18, 2018.

Synopsis
The Waldrop family consists of Eric and Courtney Waldrop; eldest son Saylor; twin boys Bridge and Wales; and sextuplets Blu, Layke, Rawlings, Rayne, Tag, and Rivers. The family announced on YouTube that they will not continue filming the show.

Eric and Courtney had struggled with infertility, ultimately becoming pregnant with the twins and the sextuplets by using fertility medication.

Courtney delivered the sextuplets via Caesarean section 30 weeks into the pregnancy.

Cast
Eric Waldrop (b. 1981)
Courtney Waldrop (b. 1982)

The big brother
 Saylor Waldrop (b. 2009)

The twins
 Bridge Ryder Waldrop (b. 2012)
 Wales Tucker Waldrop (b. 2012)

The sextuplets
 Blu Wellington Waldrop, baby A, boy, 2 lbs, 8 oz (b. 12/11/2017 1:47 pm)
 Layke Bryars Waldrop, baby B, boy, 2 lbs, 11 oz (b. 12/11/2017 1:48 pm)
 Rawlings McClaine Waldrop, baby C, girl, 2 lbs, 11 oz (b. 12/11/2017 1:49 pm)
 Rayne McCoy Waldrop, baby D, girl, 2 lbs, 12 oz (b. 12/11/2017 1:50 pm)
 Tag Bricker Waldrop, baby E, boy, 2 lbs, 4 oz (b. 12/11/2017 1:51 pm)
 Rivers McCall Waldrop, baby F, girl, 2 lbs, 13 oz (b. 12/11/2017 1:52 pm)

Episodes

Series overview

Season 1 (2018)

Season 2 (2019)

Season 3 (2020)

References

External links

2010s American reality television series
2018 American television series debuts
Sextuplets
Television series about children
Television series about families
TLC (TV network) original programming